This is a list of hospitals in Oceania for each sovereign state, associated states of New Zealand, and dependencies, and territories. Links to lists of hospitals in countries are used when there are more than a few hospitals in the country.  Oceania has an area of 8,525,989 km2 (3,291,903 sq mi) and population of 41,570,842 (2018). The World Health Organization surveys of healthcare in smaller countries are used to identify hospitals in smaller countries.

Sovereign states

Australia:  See List of hospitals in Australia
Federated States of Micronesia has four state hospitals and one private hospital.
 Chuuk State Hospital in Weno in Chuuk State
 Kosrae State Hospital in Tofol, Lelu municipality on Kosrae island in Kosrae state
 Pohnpei State Hospital in Kolonia on Pohnpei in Pohnpei State
 Yap State Hospital in Colonia on Yap in Yap State
 Genesis Hospital, Pohnpei, a private 36-bed hospital
Fiji:  See List of hospitals in Fiji
Kiribati: There are four hospitals in Kiribati:
Tungaru Central Hospital (central referral hospital), in Nawerewere, South Tarawa, 120 beds
Betio Hospital, Betio, 10 beds
London Hospital, Kiritimati, seven-beds, serves the Line and Phoenix Island groups 
Southern Kiribati Hospital (SKH) services the Southern Gilbert Islands
Marshall Islands
Leroj Atama Medical Center, Majuro Public Hospital, Delap Island, Majuro Atoll, 101 beds
Leroj Kitlang Health Center, Ebeye Hospital, Kwajalein Atoll, 45 beds
U.S. military hospital, Kwajalen Atoll
Nauru has one hospital: Republic of Nauru Hospital, Yaren District
New Zealand:  See List of hospitals in New Zealand
Palau has one hospital:  Belau National Hospital, Koror
Papua New Guinea:  See List of hospitals in Papua New Guinea
Samoa:  There are several hospitals on the islands of Upolu and Savai'i in Samoa:
Tupua Tamases Meaole (TTM) Hospital at Motootua
Poutasi District Hospital at Poutasi, Upolu Island
Leulumoga District Hospital in Leulumoega, Upolu island
Sataua District Hospital, Sataua District, Savai'i island
Safotu District Hospital at Safotu, Savai'i island
Solomon Islands:  See List of hospitals in Solomon Islands
Tonga currently has four hospitals.
Vaiola Hospital, located in Nukuʻalofa
Prince Wellington Ngu Hospital (District hospital) in Vavaʻu 
Niu’ui Hospital (District hospital) in Haʻapai 
Niu’eki Hospital (District hospital) in ʻEua
Tuvalu has one hospital: Princess Margaret Hospital (Funafuti),  Funafuti on Fongafale islet.
Vanuatu has one hospital: Port Vila Central Hospital, serving Efate, Vanuatu, near the capital of Port Vila

Part of or associated with a sovereign state

Cook Islands (associated state with New Zealand)
Hawaii (a U.S. State) has over 25 hospitals, including the largest military hospital in Oceania, Tripler Army Medical Center hospital. See List of hospitals in Hawaii
Niue  (associated state with New Zealand)

Dependencies and territories

American Samoa (an Unincorporated territory of the United States) has one hospital: LBJ Tropical Medical Center, Faga'alu, Maoputasi County
Christmas Island (Australian External Territory) has one hospital: Christmas Island Hospital
 Cocos (Keeling) Islands (Australian external territory), no hospitals, see Healthcare in Cocos (Keeling) Islands for more details
Easter Island (special territory of Chile), Easter Island has one public hospital, Hospital de Hanga Roa, which was established in 2012.
French Polynesia (overseas collectivity of the French Republic): 
Guam (a U.S. Territory) has three hospitals including a U.S. Naval hospital.
Guam Memorial Hospital, Oka Tamuning, 201 beds
Guam Regional Medical City, Dededo, 105 beds
United States Naval Hospital Guam, Agana Heights
New Caledonia (part of Overseas France): Since 2018, New Caledonia has had five public and three private hospitals. See Health in New Caledonia, French Wikipedia
Norfolk Island (External territory of Australia): Norfolk Island has one hospital, the Norfolk Island Hospital
Northern Mariana Islands (insular area and commonwealth of the United States) currently has one active hospital.  Japan had two hospitals in the islands during World War II.
Japanese Hospital (Saipan), during World War II
Japanese Hospital (Rota), during World War II
Commonwealth Health Center, Saipan, 74 beds
Pitcairn Islands (British Overseas Territory), With a population of 50 in 2020, there are no hospitals on Pitcairn Islands.  
Tokelau (Dependent territory of New Zealand):  Tokelau has hospitals on each of its atolls:  Atafu, Nukunonu, and Fakaofo. See also Health care in Tokelau
Wallis and Futuna:  Health care is available without charge in two hospitals on Uvea and Futuna islands.  See also Wallis and Futuna#Healthcare

History
During wartime and refugee situations, there have been U.S. hospitals on outlying islands, including Wake Island and Johnston Atoll.  The Japanese had hospitals on Saipan and Rota islands during World War II.

See also
Lists of hospitals in Africa
Lists of hospitals in Asia
Lists of hospitals in Europe
Lists of hospitals in North America
Lists of hospitals in South America

References

Further reading

 
Oceania-related lists